Renata Knapik-Miazga (born 15 July 1988) is a Polish épée fencer, bronze medallist at the 2013 European Fencing Championships.

Career
Knapik took up fencing at a club in Kraków after playing with sticks as a child. When she was 14, she was forbidden by her doctors to continue fencing because of problems with her right hand. She switched her weapon hand and went on. She won both an individual and team bronze medal at the 2007 Junior European Championships, then a silver medal at the 2011 U23 European Championships.

In the senior category she climbed her first World Cup podium in 2010 with a third place in Florina. She was national champion of Poland in 2012 and 2013. At the 2013 European Championships in Zagreb she reached the quarter-finals by defeating Ukraine's Anfisa Pochkalova, then lost to Romania's Ana Maria Brânză and came away with a bronze medal.

Knapik studies civil engineering from the Tadeusz Kościuszko University of Technology.

References

External links
 knapik-miazga.pl, personal website
 Profile at the KKS Kraków fencing club
Profile at the European Fencing Confederation

1988 births
Living people
Polish female épée fencers
Olympic fencers of Poland
Sportspeople from Tarnów
World Fencing Championships medalists
Fencers at the 2020 Summer Olympics
20th-century Polish women
21st-century Polish women